The Northern Pacific Conference (Nor-Pac) was formed for baseball for the 1975 season and comprised the NCAA programs in the Northwest not in the Pacific-8 Conference. The Big Sky Conference had dropped sponsorship of the sport after the 1974 season, and its three remaining baseball programs (Gonzaga, Idaho, Boise State) joined Portland State, Portland, Seattle U., and  An eighth team, Eastern Washington, was added after the 

Idaho and Boise State dropped varsity baseball after the 1980 season, as did Seattle U., and the five-team Nor-Pac played a seventh and final season  Puget Sound dropped its program and the remaining four (GU, EWU, PSU, UP) joined the Northern division of the Pac-10 (as affiliate members, baseball only) for 1982; Oregon also discontinued baseball after  which had left just three teams (Washington, Washington State, and Oregon State). In the Pac-10, the champion of the seven-team Northern division met the runner-up of the stronger six-team Southern division in a best-of-three series for the conference's second berth in the NCAA tournament.

Eastern Washington dropped baseball in 1990, and Portland State eight years later; after 1995, Gonzaga and Portland moved their baseball to the West Coast Conference (WCC), where their other sports were. Baseball returned at Oregon in 2009, Seattle U. in 2010, and Boise State in 2020.

Champions
{| class=wikitable style="text-align:center"
!Year !! Champion !! Runner-up !! Members!! Notes
|-
| 1975 ||align=left|Puget Sound|| align=left|Gonzaga ||7|| 
|-
| 1976 || align=left|Gonzaga || align=left|Boise State ||7||
|-
| 1977 || align=left|Portland State || align=left|Gonzaga ||7|| 
|-
| 1978 || align=left|Gonzaga ||align=left|Portland State||7||
|-
| 1979 || align=left|Portland ||align=center|Portland State ||7|| 
|-
| 1980 || align=left|Gonzaga || align=left|Portland||8||
|-
| 1981 || align=left|Gonzaga  ||align=left|E. Washington||5||
|}

References 

Defunct NCAA Division I conferences
1975 establishments in the United States
1981 disestablishments in the United States
College sports in Idaho
College sports in Oregon
College sports in Washington (state)
Sports leagues established in 1975
Sports leagues disestablished in 1981